Pyotr Tolstikhin (25 January 1927 – 13 May 2002) was a Russian sailor. He competed in the Dragon event at the 1956 Summer Olympics.

References

External links
 

1927 births
2002 deaths
Russian male sailors (sport)
Soviet male sailors (sport)
Olympic sailors of the Soviet Union
Sailors at the 1956 Summer Olympics – Dragon
People from Chernogorsk
Sportspeople from Khakassia